Essence to Essence is the eleventh studio album, and thirteenth album overall, from British singer-songwriter Donovan. It was released in both the UK (Epic SEPC 69050) and the US (Epic KE 32800) in December 1973.

History
By late 1973, Donovan abandoned the style of glam rock featured on his Cosmic Wheels album earlier that year. Andrew Loog Oldham was brought in (replacing Mickie Most) to co-produce Donovan's next album, which would highlight the subdued style of his previous work. Many of the songs were released on Live in Japan: Spring Tour 1973, but that album was not released outside Japan.

In a clear sign of Donovan's waning popularity, Essence to Essence became the third Donovan album after H.M.S. Donovan and earlier Fairytale to fail to reach the top 25 in the U.S. charts. Essence to Essence missed the UK album charts altogether and peaked at No. 174 in the United States.

On Essence to Essence, Donovan focuses on spirituality and meditative lyrics. The album art features Donovan clothed in white robes, kneeling as in meditation. While the album was derided as a critical failure at the time of its release, many of the songs went on to form a major part of Donovan's live repertoire throughout the 1970s and 1980s.

Reissues
On 26 January 1998 Epic/Rewind Records released Essence to Essence in the UK (Epic/Rewind 489443 2), marking the first CD release for the album.
On 23 February 2004 Diablo Records released Cosmic Wheels/Essence to Essence (DIAB8051) in the UK on CD. This compilation includes all of Cosmic Wheels and all of Essence to Essence on one disc.

Track listing
All tracks by Donovan Leitch.

Side one
"Operating Manual for Spaceship Earth" – 3:28
"Lazy Daze" – 4:43
"Life Goes On" – 2:37
"There is an Ocean" – 4:49
"Dignity of Man" – 5:19

Side two
"Yellow Star" – 3:07
"Divine Daze of Deathless Delight" – 3:10
"Boy for Every Girl" – 4:15
"Saint Valentine's Angel" – 3:57
"Life is a Merry-Go-Round" – 4:00
"Sailing Homeward" – 2:56

 Note: on some album centres "Divine Daze of Deathless Delight" is incorrectly timed as 4:00 and "Life is a Merry-Go-Round" as 3:13.

Personnel
Donovan – vocals, acoustic guitar
Henry McCullough, Danny Kortchmar, Doug Schlink, Neil Hubbard, Steve Marriott, Peter Frampton – electric guitar
Alan Spenner, Carl Radle, Leland Sklar, Paul Ossola – bass guitar
Danny Thompson – double bass on "There is an Ocean"
Carole King, Craig Doerge, Jean Roussel – piano
Nicky Hopkins – piano, Fender Rhodes on "Operating Manual for Spaceship Earth"
Bobby Whitlock – Hammond organ on "Lazy Daze"
Bruce Rowland, Denny Seiwell, Jim Gordon, Russ Kunkel – drums
Ray Cooper – percussion
Tom Scott – woodwind
Jack Emblow – accordion
Chris Nicholls – bass flute
Simon Jeffes – koto
The Scratch Band – background vocals
Andrew Powell, Del Newman, Nicky Harrison – strings

References

External links
 Essence To Essence – Donovan Unofficial Site
 1973 Donovan – Essence To Essence at Sessiondays.com.

Donovan albums
1973 albums
Albums produced by Andrew Loog Oldham
Epic Records albums
Albums recorded at Morgan Sound Studios